Yangi-Yurt (Yañı Yort) is a rural locality (a khutor) in Yanurusovsky Selsoviet, Ishimbaysky District, Bashkortostan, Russia. The population was 55 as of 2010. There are 2 streets.

Geography 
Yangi-Yurt is located 56 km northeast of Ishimbay (the district's administrative centre) by road. Tugayevo is the nearest rural locality.

References 

Rural localities in Ishimbaysky District